Lars Andersson (born 18 February 1988) is a Swedish cyclist.

Palmares
2011
4th Tartu GP
6th Scandinavian Race Uppsala
2012
1st Stage 1 Tour d'Algérie
2nd National Road Race Championships
6th Scandinavian Race Uppsala
2013
6th Scandinavian Race Uppsala
2014
6th Scandinavian Race Uppsala

References 

1988 births
Living people
Swedish male cyclists
Sportspeople from Gothenburg